Acrotretida is an extinct order of linguliform brachiopods in the class Lingulata. They lived from the Lower Cambrian to the Middle Devonian, with their peak diversity from the Middle Cambrian to the Ordovician. Acrotretida contains the sole superfamily Acrotretoidea. 

Many acrotretides have a tall and conical ventral valve with a pedicle opening at the apex, while the dorsal valve was convex to a much lesser degree. Based on preserved muscle scars, the lateral muscles are shifted back and condensed into large bundles of tendons. These replace the stout, column-like central muscles, which are present in other linguliforms but apparently absent in acrotretides. The larval shell, which is retained near the pedicle opening, has a strongly pitted texture. The adult shell is smooth and has a rounded outline, and is phosphatic like other linguliforms.

Subgroups 

 Superfamily Acrotretoidea Schuchert, 1893
 Family Acrotretidae Schuchert, 1893 (Lower Cambrian - mid-Silurian [Wenlock])
 Family Biernatidae Holmer, 1989 (Lower Ordovician [Tremadoc] - Middle Devonian)
 Family Ceratretidae Rowell, 1965 (Cambrian)
 Family Curticiidae Walcott & Schuchert, 1908 (Middle Cambrian - Upper Cambrian)
 Family Eoconulidae Rowell, 1965 (Middle Ordovician [Arenig] - Upper Ordovician [Ashgill])
 Family Ephippelasmatidae Rowell, 1965 (Upper Cambrian - Upper Ordovician [Ashgill])
 Family Scaphelasmatidae Rowell, 1965 (Middle Cambrian [Amgan] - Upper Silurian)
 Family Torynelasmatidae Rowell, 1965 (Middle Ordovician [Arenig] - Silurian)

 Incertae sedis
 Craniotreta Termier & Monod, 1978
 Dzhagdicus Sobolev, 1992
 Schizotretoides Termier & Monod, 1978

References

External links
AccessScience entry

Prehistoric brachiopods
Brachiopod orders
Lingulata